Secret Story (season 7) or Secret Story 7 is the seventh season of various versions of television show Secret Story and may refer to:

 Secret Story (French season 7), the 2013 edition of the French version.
 Secret Story 7 (Portugal), the 2018 edition of the Portuguese version.